Cyperus sphaerocephalus is a species of sedge that is native to parts of Africa.

The species was first formally described by the botanist Martin Vahl in 1805.

See also 
 List of Cyperus species

References 

sphaerocephalus
Taxa named by Martin Vahl
Plants described in 1805
Flora of Somalia
Flora of South Africa
Flora of Angola
Flora of Malawi
Flora of Mozambique
Flora of Swaziland
Flora of Tanzania
Flora of Zambia
Flora of Zimbabwe